Ronald Edwin Hall (March 15, 1964 – May 19, 2007) was a professional American football player who was selected by the Tampa Bay Buccaneers in the 4th round of the 1987 NFL Draft. A , 238 lbs. tight end from the University of Hawaii, Hall played in 9 NFL seasons from 1987 to 1995.

References

1964 births
2007 deaths
American football tight ends
Hawaii Rainbow Warriors football players
Detroit Lions players
Tampa Bay Buccaneers players
Ed Block Courage Award recipients